El Castillo de Arcos de la frontera (Spanish: Castillo de Arcos de la Frontera) is a castle located in Arcos de la Frontera, Spain. It was declared Bien de Interés Cultural in 1993.

References 

Bien de Interés Cultural landmarks in the Province of Cádiz
Castles in Andalusia
Buildings and structures completed in the 11th century
Buildings and structures completed in the 15th century